Helmut Huter was an Austrian luger who competed in the late 1970s and early 1980s. A natural track luger, he won two medals in the men's doubles event at the FIL World Luge Natural Track Championships with a silver in 1979 and a bronze in 1980.

Huter also two medals at the FIL European Luge Natural Track Championships with a gold in 1978 (Doubles) and a bronze in 1975 (Singles).

References

External links
Natural track European Championships results 1970-2006.
Natural track World Championships results: 1979-2007

Austrian male lugers
Possibly living people
Year of birth missing